Brănești is a commune in Gorj County, Oltenia, Romania. It is composed of six villages: Bădești, Brănești, Brebenei, Capu Dealului, Gilortu and Pârâu.

References

Communes in Gorj County
Localities in Oltenia